Berry-Bouy is a commune in the Cher department in the Centre-Val de Loire region of France.

Geography

Population

Places of interest
 The church of St. Hilaire, dating from the nineteenth century.
The abandoned church of St.Pantaléon at Bouy.

See also
Communes of the Cher department

References

Communes of Cher (department)